Starksia nanodes, the dwarf blenny, is a species of labrisomid blenny native to coral reefs of the Caribbean Sea and the adjacent Atlantic Ocean.  This species can reach a length of  SL.

References

nanodes
Fish described in 1961
Taxa named by Victor G. Springer
Taxa named by James Erwin Böhlke